John N. Dilleshaw (1896 near New Hope, GeorgiaOctober 14, 1941), nicknamed Seven Foot Dilly, was an American Old-time musician and guitarist.

Childhood 
Dilleshaw was born near the village of New Hope in Paulding County, northwest of Atlanta. In his late teens, he suffered a gunshot wound to the foot, and during his recovery he began to learn the guitar. Motivated, he was assisted by a local black musician named Bill Turner. Shortly after Dilleshaw played with other musicians from the County.

Career 
Around 1925 Dilleshaw was regularly heard with guitarist Charles S. Brook on the radio station WSB in Atlanta. The city was the center of the Georgia Old-Time Music and also the contact point for various record labels, who had installed their mobile recording studio recordings and artists of all genres, but especially rural musicians. Dilleshaw worked at the municipal fire department while on evenings and weekends, especially on the radio occurred and also played with the Dixie String Band.

In 1929 Dilleshaw founded his own band, which often performed under the name Seven Foot Dilly and His Dill Pickles. The group consisted of Harry next Dilleshaw Kiker (fiddle), Pink Lindsey (bass) and his son Shorty ( tenor banjo). When in March 1929 Okeh Records sent a team to Atlanta to record local groups, and accounted Dilleshaw. The plates were published under the name John Dilleshaw & The String Marvel "the string marvel was Lindsey). With his band, The Square Dance Fight or A Fiddler's Tryout in Georgia, was also with fiddler A. A. Gray on some items, or experimented with blues numbers.

In November 1930, he made his last recordings for Vocalion.

He died in Atlanta in 1941 at age 44.

References

1896 births
1941 deaths
Old-time musicians
People from Paulding County, Georgia
American male guitarists
20th-century American guitarists
American folk guitarists
Guitarists from Georgia (U.S. state)
20th-century American male musicians